The 2016 Kazakhstan Basketball Cup was the 14th edition of the Kazakhstan Basketball Cup, the highest professional cup basketball competition in Kazakhstan.

Group stage

Third place game

Final

2015
Cup